The Berzasca is a left tributary of the river Danube in Romania. It discharges into the Danube in the village Berzasca.

References

Rivers of Romania
Rivers of Caraș-Severin County